Carlos del Barrio (born 15 August 1968) is a Spanish rally co-driver. He is currently teamed with Dani Sordo and is competing for Hyundai in the World Rally Championship.

Rally career
Carlos del Barrio began his rally career in 1991, co-driving for several drivers.

In 2011, he formed a partnership with Dani Sordo in Mini WRC Team. 

In 2013 Rallye Deutschland, he and Sordo won their first WRC victory, 53 seconds over Thierry Neuville.

Carlos del Barrio ended his partnership with Sordo after 2013, but resumed in 2018. They now drive for Hyundai Motorsport.

Victories

WRC victories

Results

WRC results

* Season still in progress.

References

External links

 Carlos del Barrio's e-wrc profile

1968 births
Living people
Spanish rally co-drivers
World Rally Championship co-drivers